The Groveland Hotel, at 18767 Main St. (CA 120) in Groveland, California, was listed on the National Register of Historic Places in 1994.

The Groveland Hotel was built in 1850 as a two-story  adobe building. In 1915 a Hotel Annex was built as a wood-frame building. The hotel annex was designed by architect Woodward Withered and constructed by Robert Scudamore, builder.

It has also been known as the Garrote Hotel and as the Groveland Inn & Cafe.

References

Hotels in California
National Register of Historic Places in Tuolumne County, California
Neoclassical architecture in California
Hotel buildings completed in 1850